The following highways are numbered 15A:

United States
 Florida State Road 15A
 County Road 15A (Volusia County, Florida)
 Nebraska Spur 15A
 New York State Route 15A
 County Route 15A (Cayuga County, New York)
 County Route 15A (Genesee County, New York)
 South Dakota Highway 15A
 Vermont Route 15A
 Secondary State Highway 15A (Washington) (former)